Salem School District may refer to:

 Salem School District (Arkansas), based in Salem, Fulton County, Arkansas.
 Salem School District (Connecticut), based in Salem, Connecticut.
 Salem School District (Massachusetts), based in Salem, Massachusetts.
 Salem School District (New Hampshire), based in Salem, New Hampshire.
 Salem School District (Wisconsin), based in Salem, Kenosha County, Wisconsin.

Also, it may refer to:
 Salem City School District (New Jersey), based in Salem, New Jersey.
 Salem City School District (Ohio), based in Salem, Ohio.
 Salem-Keizer School District, based in Oregon.
 Benton-Carroll-Salem Local School District, based in Ohio.
 Greensburg-Salem School District, based in North Carolina.